Malek Kola (also Romanized as Malek Kolā) is a village in Aliabad Rural District, in the Central District of Qaem Shahr County, Mazandaran Province, Iran. At the 2006 census, its population was 2,525, in 662 families.

References 

Populated places in Qaem Shahr County